Richard Buchta (Austrian German pronunciation: [ˈrɪçart ˈbuxtɐ], 19 January 1845 – 29 July 1894) was an Austrian explorer in East Africa, travel writer, painter and photographer. Born in Radlow, Galicia, Austrian Empire, he traveled widely, first to Germany, France, the Balkans, and Turkey, Egypt and the Sudan. Upon his return to Germany and later to Austria, he published several books on the geography, ethnic groups and political conditions of the historic Sudan in the 1870s and 1880s. His historical photographs, taken mainly in southern Sudan, are regarded as the earliest photographs of ethnic people living along the White Nile and beyond.

Life and travels 
In 1877, Buchta arrived at Khartoum, where Charles George Gordon, then Governor-General of the Turkish-Egyptian Sudan, facilitated his onward journey to Emin Pasha at Ladó, on the Upper Nile. There, he traveled with Italian explorer Romolo Gessi further along the towards the sources of the White Nile as far as to today's northern Uganda. He took some of the earliest existing photographs of ethnic people in these regions, such as the Acholi, Bari, Zande, Shilluk or Dinka. Upon his return to Germany in 1881, he published his impressions along with 160 mounted albumen prints in the book Die obern Nilländer: Volkstypen und Landschaften. (in English: The Lands of the Upper Nile: Ethnic people and Landscapes). 

In 1885, he undertook another voyage through Egypt and the desert to Fayum. He was also a collaborator on the first volume of Wilhelm Junker's work Travels in Africa: During the years 1875-1878.

Importance for early photography in Africa 

Many of his photographs have been used for anthropological studies and are kept in different collections such as in the Pitt Rivers Museum, Oxford, UK, as well as in the collections of the Museum of Ethnology, in Vienna.

Even though his photographs were frequently reproduced by travel writers of the time, his work was largely forgotten in the 20th century. In the context of studies on the history of photography in Africa, however, the importance of Buchta's visual records and their influence on late 19th century anthropological studies on Africa have gained new attention. 

On the occasion of an exhibition of his photographs in 2015, the Pitt Rivers Museum wrote: "His journey into Equatoria Province (now parts of South Sudan and northern Uganda) shaped the visual representation of its peoples in European literature for a generation, being celebrated and reproduced, mostly in engraved form, by all the major explorer-writers of central Africa in the period."

Selected works (in German) 

 Die obern Nilländer, Volkstypen und Landschaften, with 160 photographic views (1881)

 Der Sudan und der Mahdi. Das Land, die Bewohner und der Aufstand (1884)

 Der Sudan unter ägyptischer Herrschaft (1888)

See also 

 Photography in Sudan

References

Further reading 

 Robert Brown (1893) The story of Africa and its explorers, Cassell & Co., London 
 David Killingray and Andrew Roberts: An Outline History of Photography in Africa to ca. 1940. In: History in Africa, Vol. 16 (1989), pp.199-200
Christopher Morton and Darren Newbury. The African Photographic Archive: Research and Curatorial Strategies. Bloomsbury Publishing 2015, pp.19-38
Christopher Morton. Richard Buchta and the Visual Representation of Equatoria in the Later Nineteenth Century. The African Photographic Archive: Research and Curatorial Strategies, pp 19-38., 2015
Pitt Rivers Museum Photograph and Manuscript Collections. Richard Buchta's photographs of Equatoria, 1878–1880. 2015

External links

198 Historical photographs by Richard Buchta in the online collection of the Museum of Ethnology in Vienna (with free downloads, enlarged viewing, sharing on social media)

1845 births
1894 deaths
People from Tarnów County
Austrian male writers
Explorers of Africa
History of Sudan
Historical photographs of Sudan
Photography in Sudan
Expatriate photographers in Sudan
Pioneers of photography
19th century in Sudan